Shadowlands is a 1993 British biographical drama film about the relationship between academic C. S. Lewis (played by Anthony Hopkins) and Jewish American poet Joy Davidman (played by Debra Winger), her death from cancer, and how this challenged his Christianity. It was directed by Richard Attenborough with a screenplay by William Nicholson based on his 1985 television film and 1989 stage play of the same name. The 1985 script began life as I Call It Joy written for Thames Television by Brian Sibley and Norman Stone. Sibley later wrote the book, Shadowlands: The True Story of C. S. Lewis and Joy Davidman. The film won the 1993 BAFTA Award for Outstanding British Film. The film marked the last film appearance of English actor Michael Denison.

Plot
In the 1950s, the reserved, middle-aged bachelor C. S. Lewis is an Oxford University academic at Magdalen College and author of The Chronicles of Narnia series of children's books. He meets the married American poet Joy Davidman Gresham and her young son Douglas on their visit to England, not yet knowing the circumstances of Gresham's troubled marriage.

What begins as a formal meeting of two very different minds slowly develops into a feeling of connection and love. Lewis finds his quiet life with his brother Warnie disrupted by the outspoken Gresham, whose uninhibited behaviour sharply contrasts with the rigid sensibilities of the male-dominated university. Each provides the other with new ways of viewing the world.

Initially, their marriage is one of convenience, a platonic union designed to allow Gresham to remain in England. But when she is diagnosed with cancer, deeper feelings surface, and Lewis' beliefs are tested as his wife tries to prepare him for her death.

Cast

 Anthony Hopkins as C. S. "Jack" Lewis
 Debra Winger as Joy Davidman
 Edward Hardwicke as Warren "Warnie" Lewis
 Joseph Mazzello as Douglas Gresham
 James Frain as Peter Whistler
 Julian Fellowes as Desmond Arding
 Michael Denison as Harry Harrington
 John Wood as Christopher Riley
 Peter Firth as Dr. Craig
 Tim McMullan as Nick Farrell
 Robert Flemyng as Claude Bird

Critical reception
Shadowlands received positive reviews from critics. The review aggregator website Rotten Tomatoes reported that 97% of critics have given the film a positive review based on 30 reviews, with an average rating of 8.02/10. The site's critics consensus reads, "Thanks to brilliant performances from Debra Winger and especially Anthony Hopkins, Shadowlands is a deeply moving portrait of British scholar C.S. Lewis's romance with American poet Joy Gresham."

Roger Ebert of the Chicago Sun-Times called the film "intelligent, moving and beautifully acted."

Rita Kempley of The Washington Post described it as "a high-class tear-jerker" and a "literate hankie sopper" and added, "William Nicholson's screenplay brims with substance and wit, though it's essentially a soap opera with a Rhodes scholarship . . . [Winger] and Hopkins lend great tenderness and dignity to what is really a rather corny tale of a love that was meant to be."

In Variety, Emanuel Levy observed, "It's a testament to the nuanced writing of William Nicholson ... that the drama works effectively on both personal and collective levels ... Attenborough opts for modest, unobtrusive direction that serves the material and actors ... Hopkins adds another laurel to his recent achievements. As always, there's music in his speech and nothing is over-deliberate or forced about his acting ... Coming off years of desultory and unimpressive movies, Winger at last plays a role worthy of her talent."

Awards and honours

Year-end lists
 3rd – James Berardinelli, ReelViews
 Top 10 (not ranked) – George Meyer, The Ledger
 Honorable mention – Dan Craft, The Pantagraph

Changes from the stage play or earlier television production
The stage play opens with Lewis giving a talk about the mystery of suffering, whereas this film intersperses a similar talk several times throughout the narrative. The television film opens with Lewis giving a radio broadcast about the sanctity of marriage.

In the stage play as in reality, Lewis and Davidman honeymoon in Greece. In the film, on their honeymoon they look for the "Golden Valley" in Herefordshire, England, as depicted in a painting hanging in Lewis' study.

As in the stage play, though not the earlier television film, Joy has only one son. In the original television film, as in reality, Joy had two sons, Douglas and David.

References

External links
 
 
 
 Shadowlands at Arts&Faith.com

1993 films
1990s biographical drama films
British biographical drama films
Remakes of British films
Biographical films about writers
British films based on plays
Films set in the 1950s
Films set in Oxford
Films set in the University of Oxford
C. S. Lewis
Best British Film BAFTA Award winners
Films directed by Richard Attenborough
Films scored by George Fenton
Films produced by Richard Attenborough
Savoy Pictures films
Spelling Films films
Films with screenplays by William Nicholson
1993 drama films
Cultural depictions of C. S. Lewis
1990s English-language films
1990s British films